Pavel Beltiukov (Russian: Павел Бельтюков), also known as Pavel Beltukov, or simply Pavel, is a professional esports who is ranked 2nd in tournament rankings for Hearthstone as of May 2018.

Beltiukov began his Hearthstone career in 2015. In 2016, Beltiukov won the BlizzCon Hearthstone tournament earning $250,000 and gained the title of Hearthstone World Champion. Beltiukov won the first event in the 2017 Hearthstone Championship Tour defeating James "Greensheep" Luo.

As of 2017, Beltiukov is the highest earning Hearthstone player in tournament winnings amassing over $275,000.

References

External links
 
 

Hearthstone players
Russian Internet celebrities
Russian esports players
1998 births
Living people
Twitch (service) streamers